Neustadt is a town in the Marburg-Biedenkopf district in Hesse, Germany.

Geography

Location
Neustadt lies in the Middle Hessian Bergland ("Highland") at the eastern end of Marburg-Biedenkopf district.

Neighbouring communities
Neustadt borders in the north on the community of Gilserberg, in the east on the town of Schwalmstadt and the community of Willingshausen (all three in the Schwalm-Eder-Kreis), in the southeast on the community of Antrifttal, in the south on the town of Kirtorf (both in the Vogelsbergkreis), and in the west on the town of Stadtallendorf (Marburg-Biedenkopf).

Town divisions
Neustadt has, as well as the core community known as Neustadt, centres known as Mengsberg, Momberg and Speckswinkel.

Politics

Town council

After municipal elections on 26 March 2006, the town council is arranged thus:

Coat of arms
Neustadt's coat of arms, like many throughout western Germany, depicts Saint Martin of Tours cutting off a piece of his cloak for a poor man and the Wheel of Mainz.

Town partnerships

Neustadt is a member of the international town friendship called the Arbeitsgemeinschaft Neustadt in Europa, which as of 2005 had 34 member towns – all named Neustadt – in five countries.

Culture and sightseeing

Buildings

 Junker-Hansen-Turm (tower), a remainder of a castle built in 1480 by the fortification building master Hans Jakob von Ettlingen; has the world's biggest half-timbered rotunda.

References

External links

 Official website

Marburg-Biedenkopf